Wednesday Night Baseball 
is a live game telecast of Major League Baseball.

The series formally aired every Wednesday night during the regular season on ESPN. However, beginning with the 2022 Major League Baseball season, ESPN significantly reduced their MLB schedule, which included cutting most, if not all, of their Wednesday Night Baseball games. Wednesday Night Baseball games now generally air on Fox Sports 1 and MLB Network.

On ESPN, the game started at  ET, following SportsCenter, and usually lasted around three hours with an hour-long Baseball Tonight following the game leading up to the  ET SportsCenter ( ET for September games with Baseball Tonight moving to ESPN2 at  ET). Every April some broadcasts aired on ESPN2 due to ESPN's priority with Wednesday's NBA coverage.

Wednesday Night Baseball is not exclusive, as it is usually blacked out in the teams' local markets, where the respective local broadcasters may still air the game, unless local broadcasters choose not to televise the game. ESPNEWS was seen on ESPN during the game in the teams' designated markets. The blackout (100-mile radius from the stadium, and all of a team's designated market) can be lifted in the latter scenario. On double-headers in September, due to the broadcast of Monday Night Football, either one of the Wednesday Night Baseball games will co-exist with the local markets' carriers and will not always be subject to blackout.

Commentators
A complete list of broadcasters, with their period of tenure on the show (beginning years of each season shown).

Manny Acta: (analyst, 2013–2015)
Erin Andrews: (field reporter, 2008)
Chris Berman: (play-by-play, 1990–2016, select games)
Bonnie Bernstein: (field reporter, 2007, select games)
Steve Berthiaume: (fill-in play-by-play, 2007–2012)
Aaron Boone: (fill-in analyst, 2010–2017, for September games only)
Jeff Brantley: (analyst, 2002–2005)
Dave Campbell: (analyst, 1990–2002)
Bob Carpenter: (play-by-play, 1990–2004)
Duke Castiglione: (field reporter, 2006)
Nomar Garciaparra: (analyst, 2010–2013)
Doug Glanville: (analyst, 2013–2017)
Pedro Gomez (field reporter, 2011–2014)
Orel Hershiser: (analyst, 2001 and 2006–2007; 2009–2010 for September games)
Chipper Jones: (analyst, 2020)
Tim Kurkjian: (field reporter, 2011–2014, for September games only)
Barry Larkin: (fill-in analyst, 2013–2014)
Steve Levy: (fill-in play-by-play, 2013–2021)
Buck Martinez: (analyst, 1992–2000 and 2002–05)
Sean McDonough: (play-by-play, 2011–2012, for September games only; 2013–2015, select games)
Mark Mulder: (fill-in analyst, 2013–2015)
Joe Morgan: (analyst, 1990–2010, select games)
Dave O'Brien: (play-by-play, 2008–2012; 2013–2015, for September games only)
Steve Phillips: (analyst, 2007)
Karl Ravech: (fill-in play-by-play, 2013–2021)
David Ross: (analyst, 2017–2019)
Curt Schilling: (analyst, 2013–2016)
Jon Sciambi: (play-by-play, 2005; fill-in play-by-play, 2013; play-by-play, 2014–2021)
Xavier Scruggs: (analyst 2021)
Rick Sutcliffe: (analyst, 2008–2021)
Dan Shulman: (play-by-play, 1995–2007;  2009–2010 for September games)

History

The program debuted in 1990, when ESPN first acquired MLB rights. From 2000 to 2005, broadcasts consisted of a doubleheader, usually airing the first game at  ET on ESPN and the second at  ET on ESPN2. The second part of the doubleheader was discontinued after 2005 season.

However, ESPN DayGame was also discontinued following the 2006 season.

In 2021, ESPN agreed to a new contract with Major League Baseball through the 2028 season. However, the deal included only around 30 exclusive broadcasts, most of which would take place on Sunday Night Baseball. Thus, it is likely that Wednesday Night Baseball may move to Fox Sports 1, and MLB Network as part of the MLB Network Showcase package.

Wednesday Night Baseball on other networks
Nationally televised baseball on Wednesday nights is not exclusive to ESPN. Recently, nationally televised Wednesday games have also aired on networks such as FS1 or MLB Network.

FS1 (2017-2018, 2020-present)
While nationally televised FS1 games usually air on Friday and Saturday nights, FS1 has also aired games on Wednesday nights since 2017. Usually, they're on days when ESPN is covering other sports.

Schedule

MLB Network (2009-present)
Since 2009, MLB Network airs live baseball most weeknights, including games. Wednesday games on MLB Network tend to just be simulcasts of games produced by regional sports networks and not games directly produced by MLB network.

See also
ESPN Major League Baseball
Baseball Tonight
Sunday Night Baseball
Monday Night Baseball
Thursday Night Baseball
Fox Major League Baseball
Major League Baseball on ESPN Radio
ESPN Major League Baseball broadcasters
Major League Baseball on ESPN Radio broadcasters
List of current Major League Baseball announcers

Resources
ESPN.tv
Press Release: ESPN’s Signature MLB Franchises Return - Sunday, Monday and Wednesday Night Baseball

References

External links
Baseball on ESPN.tv
MLB on ESPN.com
Searchable Network TV Broadcasts

1990 American television series debuts
2000s American television series
2010s American television series
ESPN original programming
ESPN2 original programming
Major League Baseball on television
Sports telecast series
Wednesday